Zazeh (also known as Zazz) is a village in Alamarvdasht Rural District, Alamarvdasht District, Lamerd County, Fars Province, Iran. At the 2006 census, its population was 78, in 21 families.

References 

Populated places in Lamerd County